Christopher Street Day (CSD) is an annual European LGBTQ+ celebration and demonstration held in various cities across Europe for the rights of LGBTQ+ people, and against discrimination and exclusion. It is Germany's and Switzerland's counterpart to Gay Pride or Pride Parades. Austria calls their Pride Parade Rainbow Parade. The most prominent CSD events are Berlin Pride, CSD Hamburg, CSD Cologne, Germany and Zürich in Switzerland.

History 
The CSD is held in memory of the Stonewall Riots, the first big uprising of LGBT people against police assaults that took place at the Stonewall Inn, a bar on Manhattan, New York City's Christopher Street in the district of Greenwich Village on June 28, 1969.

On Saturday, June 27, 1970, marches to mark the first anniversary of Stonewall were held in Chicago and San Francisco, followed on Sunday, June 28, 1970, by the Christopher Street Liberation Day Parade in New York and the Christopher Street West Association Parade in Los Angeles; the four gatherings were the first Pride parades in United States history. To accommodate the interests of the many different groups participating, the Christopher Street Liberation Day Committee named the days leading up to the march Gay Pride Week.

The first four American cities have since continued to celebrate Pride on the last weekend of each June. It has become an international tradition to hold a demonstration for the rights of LGBT people in the summer. The first German Christopher Street Day took place in Berlin in 1979; other parades before then had different names. The first documented LGBT parade in Germany was in Münster on 29 April 1972.  The first parade in Switzerland was celebrated on June 24, 1978 in Zürich and was called "Christopher Street Liberation Memorial Day."

Current situation 
CSD Berlin started already in 1979. Now almost every large city in Germany celebrates CSD, with the largest in Berlin (Berlin Pride), Hamburg (Hamburg Pride) and Cologne (Cologne Pride). When Cologne hosted Europride in 2002, it attracted 1.2 million participants and spectators to the city together with the Cologne Carnival.

Due to organizational reasons, the CSDs do not take place on the historic date of June 27, but on different weekends between June and August. On the one hand, CSDs are considered political parades, and therefore also include speeches, political mottos, and attendances and patronages from well-known politicians. On the other hand, CSDs are often compared to carnival processions or techno parades, in which celebrating and partying are the main focus. This is the idea of all gay pride parades: through celebrating, the LGBT community shows that they can be proud of themselves and their community.

A typical Christopher Street Day Parade includes floats as well as walking groups usually provided by and made up of members of LGBT organizations, but is increasingly used also as a platform for political campaigning and commercial advertising as floats by political parties and commercially sponsored trucks are becoming more common.  It is also typical to see many drag queens or women and men (mostly the latter) scantily dressed. BDSM enthusiasts also often participate in CSDs. The parade is usually quite joyous and has a rather upbeat and exciting energy to it. In addition to the Parade and the final rallies, in many cities there are days or up to whole weeks of street festivals and cultural events with artists, political events, lectures, readings, parties and other festivities.

In Berlin 

The largest gay street party in Europe is held each year since 1993 in Berlin and is called Lesbian and Gay City Festival (Lesbisch-schwules Stadtfest Berlin). Today Berlin is the leading city in Europe when it comes to gay events with four major gay festivals held each year: Lesbian and Gay City Festival, Berlin Pride, Folsom Europe and Easter in Berlin. Even a smaller Pride Parade called Kreuzberg Pride, is held every year together with Dyke March.

The growth and commercialization of CSDs, coupled with their de-politicization – has led to an alternative CSD in  Berlin, the so-called Kreuzberg Pride (Kreuzberger CSD) or "Transgenialer" ("Transgenial"/Trans Ingenious") CSD. Political party members are not invited for speeches, nor can parties or companies sponsor floats. After the parade there is a festival with a stage for political speakers and entertainers. Groups discuss lesbian/transsexual/transgender/gay or queer perspectives on issues such as poverty and unemployment benefits (Hartz IV), gentrification, or "Fortress Europe."

In June 2010 American philosopher and theorist Judith Butler refused the Civil Courage Award (Zivilcouragepreis) of the Christopher Street Day Parade in Berlin, Germany at the award ceremony, arguing and lamenting in a speech that the parade had become too commercial, and was ignoring the problems of racism and the double discrimination facing homosexual or transsexual migrants. According to Butler, even the organizers themselves promote racism. The general manager of the CSD committee, Robert Kastl, countered Butler's allegations and pointed out that the organizers already awarded a counselling center for lesbians dealing with double discrimination in 2006. Regarding the allegations of commercialism Kastl explained further that the CSD organizers don't require small groups to pay a participation fee which starts at 50 € and goes up to 1500 €. He also distanced himself from all forms of racism and Islamophobia.

Politicians attending
Politicians often participate in CSDs, including:
Federal Foreign Minister and Vice Chancellor Joschka Fischer (Cologne, 2002, Hamburg 2004, Cologne 2005)
Federal Minister Renate Künast (Berlin 2001)
Former Governing Mayor of Berlin Klaus Wowereit (since 2001)
Mayor of Frankfurt Petra Roth (2004)
Prime Minister of Hesse Roland Koch (Frankfurt am Main)
President of the German Bundestag Wolfgang Thierse (Berlin 2000)

In some cities, politicians are also patrons of the CSD, for example in Hamburg, the former First Mayor Ortwin Runde, and Ole von Beust, in Dresden Mayor Ingolf Rossberg, in Würzburg Claudia Roth, in Munich the former Mayor Christian Ude as well as current Mayor Dieter Reiter and in Brunswick, the former Federal Minister Jürgen Trittin.

CSD hosts in Germany

 Aurich
 Berlin (Berlin Pride, Kreuzberg Pride, Easter in Berlin, Folsom Europe)
 Bonn
 Brunswick 
 Bremen
 Darmstadt
 Dortmund
 Dresden
 Düsseldorf
 Duisburg
 Essen 
 Erfurt
 Frankfurt am Main
 Freiburg im Breisgau
 Gera
 Hagen
 Hamburg (Hamburg Pride)
 Hanover
 Iserlohn
 Jena
 Karlsruhe
 Kassel
 Kiel
 Koblenz
 Köln (Cologne Gay Pride)
 Konstanz (CSD Bodensee)
 Krefeld
 Landshut
 Leipzig
 Lübeck
 Lüneburg
 Magdeburg
 Mannheim (CSD Rhein-Neckar)
 Mainz 
 Minden
 München
 Neustrelitz (smallest CSD in Germany)
 Nürnberg
 Oldenburg (CSD Nordwest)
 Regensburg
 Rostock
 Saarbrücken
 Siegen
 Stuttgart
 Trier
 Ulm
 Weimar
 Würzburg

See also 
 Europride
 Gay pride
 List of gay pride events
 John Paul Hudson

References

External links 

 Berlin CSD 
 Cologne CSD
 Munich CSD 
 Zürich CSD 
 Hamburg CSD 
 Frankfurt CSD 
 Weimar CSD 
 gayScout CSD Events Calendar worldwide 
 GayWeb with links to all CSD events 
 Gay Press Organization
 CSD Aurich 

Pride parades in Germany
LGBT events in Switzerland
Festivals in Berlin
Recurring events established in 1970
Parades in Switzerland